Rabbi Yisroel Pinchos Bodner is the author of several books on Jewish Law all published by Feldheim Publishers. He has received approbations for his books from various rabbis, including Rabbi Moshe Feinstein, Rabbi Shlomo Zalman Auerbach and Rabbi Chaim Pinchos Scheinberg.  He resides in Lakewood Township, New Jersey.

Selected works
Halachos of Brochos
Halachos of K'Zayis
Halachos of Muktza
Halachos of Other People's Money
Halachos of Refuah on Shabbos

References

American Haredi rabbis
People from Lakewood Township, New Jersey
Living people
Year of birth missing (living people)
21st-century American Jews